Harpalus kabakovi is a species of ground beetle in the subfamily Harpalinae. It was described by Kataev in 1987.

References

kabakovi
Beetles described in 1987